The Central District of Kalat County is a district (bakhsh) in Kalat County, Razavi Khorasan Province, Iran. At the 2006 census, its population was 22,928, in 5,630 families.  The district has one city: Kalat.  The district has two rural districts (dehestan): Hezarmasjed Rural District and Kabud Gonbad Rural District.

References 

Districts of Razavi Khorasan Province
Kalat County